Randalstown is a townland and small town in County Antrim, Northern Ireland, between Antrim and Toome. It has a very prominent disused railway viaduct and lies beside Lough Neagh and the Shane's Castle estate. The town is bypassed by the M22 motorway with junctions at both the eastern and western ends of the town. It had a population of 5,126 people in the 2011 Census.

History
The townland of Randalstown was originally known as An Dún Mór ("the great fort"), anglicised as Dunmore. This refers to a medieval motte-and-bailey castle built by the Irish on the west bank of the river Main just south of the town. A castle known as Edenduffcarrick, later Shane's Castle, was built near Randalstown in the 14th century by the O'Neills of Clannaboy.

From at least the 1650s the town was known as "Iron Mills" (Muilinn Iarainn in Irish, anglicised "Mullynieren"). In 1667, the town was created a free borough and was officially re-named Randalstown. It was re-named to mark the marriage of Randal MacDonnell, 1st Marquess of Antrim to Rose O'Neill of Shane's Castle.

The 1798 United Irishmen rebellion began in Antrim following a meeting to prepare for revolt by the Ulster Directory on 1 February 1798, at McClean's Inn, Randalstown. Robert McClean's "Great Inn" had long been an Irish Volunteers meeting place. Following his death in 1790, his son Francis became the proprietor.
 
Dunmore Park was used as a training camp for the Ulster Volunteers during the Irish Home Rule crisis.

Randalstown has a strong history of linen and iron industries. A memorial to this history is in the middle of the town and made from the original turbine used to generate mains electricity for the town and items salvaged from the Old Bleach Linen Company founded by James Webb in 1864. An old linen mill chimney from the Old Bleach factory can be seen from most parts of the town. The Dorma Old Bleach factory which operated from a neighbouring site closed down in 2002.

The town used to have an active railway station which opened in 1848 by the Belfast and Ballymena Railway. The station connected the town to the Northern Counties Committee line. The station was closed in 1950 and has been disused ever since.

On 1 October 1989, a  Provisional Irish Republican Army (IRA) car bomb exploded outside the town's police station on New Street causing serious damage to nearby property.

On 8 January 2010, PSNI Constable Peadar Heffron was seriously injured as a bomb exploded under his car on the Milltown Road near Randalstown. Dissident republicans were blamed for the attack.

Demography
On Census Day (27 March 2011) the usually resident population of Randalstown was 5,126 accounting for 0.28% of the NI total. Of these:
 99.02% were from the white (including Irish Traveller) ethnic group
 54.74% belong to or were brought up Catholic and 39.82% belong to or were brought up in a 'Protestant and other (non-Catholic) Christian (including Christian related)' 
 46.29% indicated that they had a British national identity, 24.33% had an Irish national identity and 32.91% had a Northern Irish national identity.
10.67% had some knowledge of Irish; 9.30% had some knowledge of Ulster-Scots; and 4.72% did not have English as their first language.

Places of interest

 The Tudor style gateway to the Shane's Castle estate is in the town.
 Randalstown OC Presbyterian Church, a fine example of Irish Gothic.
 Around the corner from the gateway is the seven-piered, viaduct built in 1855 to carry the railway line over the River Main.  This has had a new bridge installed and a walk path created as part of the local healthy walking areas.
 Craigmore Fishery, a Fly Fishing facility is located on the outskirts of town.
 World of Owls, Northern Ireland's only owl, bird of prey and exotic animal conservation centre is located next to Randalstown Forest.
Caddy, a hamlet 3 miles north of the Randalstown centre, was site of a new school in 1908. and also a centre of beekeeping in the 1950s.

Notable residents
 John Bodkin Adams, a suspected serial killer, was born to a Plymouth Brethren family in Randalstown on 21 January 1899 and lived here until 1901.  He became a general practitioner and worked in Eastbourne from 1922. He was charged in 1957 with the murder of two patients but was acquitted. He was, however, suspected of causing the death of 163 other patients.
 Alan Jones, Professor of Architecture at Queen's University Belfast, past president of the Royal Society of Ulster Architects and was elected the 77th President of the Royal Institute of British Architects for 1 September 2019 – 2021.
 Laurence McKeown, author, playwright, screenwriter, and former member of the IRA who took part in the 1981 Irish hunger strike, striking for 70 days. In 1995 he co-founded the Belfast Film Festival.
 Lady Moyra Campbell, maid of honour at the coronation of Elizabeth II

Education
Mount St. Michael's Primary School
Maine Integrated Primary School
St. Benedict's High School
Randalstown Central Primary School is a mixed non-denominational primary school within the North Eastern Education and Library Board area.

See also
List of localities in Northern Ireland by population
List of towns and villages in Northern Ireland
List of townlands in County Antrim
Market Houses in Northern Ireland

References

Towns in County Antrim
Townlands of County Antrim